Bolivia national basketball team is the national men's basketball team from Bolivia.

In June 2021, the Bolivians succeeded in their first undertaking for the 2023 FIBA Basketball World Cup qualification (Americas). They defeated Ecuador in two games by 91-57 (on aggregate). The home game was played at the Guadalquivir Coliseum in Tarija, where more than 2,000 people attended.

Current squad
At the 2023 FIBA Basketball World Cup qualification (Americas):

|}

| valign="top" |

Head coach
  Giovanny Vargas
Assistant coaches

Legend

Club – describes lastclub before the tournament
Age – describes ageon 16 July 2021
|}

Depth chart

Competitive record

Summer Olympics
Yet to qualify

FIBA World Cup
Yet to qualify

FIBA AmeriCup
Yet to qualify

Pan American Games

Never participated

South American Championship

Head coach position
  Sandro Patino - 2012
  Giovanny Vargas - 2019, 2021

Past squads
At the 2016 South American Basketball Championship:

|}

| valign="top" |

Head coach

Assistant coaches

Legend

Club – describes lastclub before the tournament
Age – describes ageon 26 June 2016
|}

Kit

Sponsor
2021: Entel

See also
Bolivia national under-19 basketball team
Bolivia national under-17 basketball team
Bolivia women's national basketball team
Bolivia national 3x3 team

References

External links
Official Website
Latinbasket.com - Bolivia Men National Team
FIBA profile

Videos
Bolivia (BOL) v Ecuador (ECU) - Game Highlights - Group A - 2016 FIBA South American Championship - Youtube.com video

 
Basketball in Bolivia
1947 establishments in Bolivia